The 1999–2000 Czech 1.liga season was the seventh season of the Czech 1.liga, the second level of ice hockey in the Czech Republic. 14 teams participated in the league, and HK Dukla Jihlava won the championship.

Regular season

Playoffs

Quarterfinals
 KLH Chomutov – HC Opava 3:1 (5:1, 5:2, 1:3, 3:1)
 SK Horácká Slavia Třebíč – HC Mělník 2:3 (3:2 P, 7:0, 4:5, 1:3, 2:4)
 HC Dukla Jihlava – HC Beroun 3:0 (4:3 SN, 1:0 P, 4:2)
 IHC Písek – HC Rosice 3:1 (5:2, 5:3, 5:6 P, 3:2)

Semifinals 
 KLH Chomutov – HC Mělník 3:0 (5:3, 3:0, 2:0)
 HC Dukla Jihlava – IHC Písek 3:0 (2:1, 4:1, 3:0)

Finals 
 KLH Chomutov – HC Dukla Jihlava 2:3 (5:2, 6:0, 0:2, 2:6, 2:4)

Qualification

Relegation

External links
 Season on hockeyarchives.info

2
Czech
Czech 1. Liga seasons